John Ametepey (born 25 December 1938) is a Ghanaian middle-distance runner. He competed in the men's 800 metres at the 1968 Summer Olympics.

References

External links

1938 births
Living people
Athletes (track and field) at the 1968 Summer Olympics
Ghanaian male middle-distance runners
Olympic athletes of Ghana